William J. Esposito (born February 28, 1946) is an American former FBI agent who served as Deputy Director of the Federal Bureau of Investigation in 1997.

References

1946 births
Living people
Deputy Directors of the Federal Bureau of Investigation